Paraschos is a Greek male given name and surname which – in its Latinized form – can also be found in the Greek diaspora. It is derived from the ecclesiastical phrase  ("Grant this, O Lord"), the first part of which is a conjugated (aorist) form of the Greek verb  ("to give", "to provide", "to offer").
Notable people with this name include:

 Andreas Paraschos (born 1958), Cypriot journalist 
 Georgios Paraschos (born 1952), Greek football manager and former player

References 

Greek-language surnames
Surnames